Nagulaplem is a village in Parchur Mandal in Prakasam district in the state of Andhra Pradesh, India. This village is famous for Putta which is close to Parchur. Devotees living vicinity visits this temple and offer their prayers to Lord Subramanyeswara and Lord Anjaneya. This village boasts of a good primary school education system in the region, producing scholars in the region since the 1950s, which led to the all round development in the village with the current generation in prominent positions all through the world. One of the earliest english medium schools in the region has been opened in the 1980s, where the MSFS (missionaries of Saint Francis De Sales) opened a school in this village. This village, is among the well planned villages in the area, with a pond running almost through the length of the village, giving it a cooler breeze even during the hot Indian summer.

Geography
It has an average elevation of 8 meters (32 feet) above sea-level. The annual rainfall due to the southwest monsoon. It has a tropical savanna climate (Köppen climate classification Aw) with hot summers and moderate winters. The hottest months are between April to June.

Assembly constituency

Constituency:Parchur
Loksabha: Bapatla

List of Elected Members of assembly constituency:

1955 - Kolla Ramaiah Chowadary (INC)
1962 - Naraharisetty Venkataswamy (CPI)
1967- Gade Venkata Reddy (INC)
1972- Maddukuri Narayana Rao (IND)
1978 - Maddukuri Narayana Rao(INC)
1983 - Daggubati Choudary (TDP)
1994 - Gade Venkata Reddy (INC)
1999 - Jagarlamudi Lakshmi Padmavathi (TDP)
1985(TDP), 1989(TDP), 2004(INC) and 2009(INC) - Daggubati Venkateswara Rao
2014 - Yeluri Sambasiva Rao (TDP)

List of Elected Members of Loksabha:

References

Villages in Prakasam district